Felipillo (or Felipe) was a native Amerindian interpreter who accompanied Spanish conquistadors Francisco Pizarro and Diego de Almagro on their various expeditions to Peru during their conquest of the Inca Empire. His real name is not known.

Biography
There is discrepancy between the Spanish contemporary sources about the town of birth of Felipillo. According to some of them, he was a native of Tumbez, whilst, according to others, he was born in the region Poechos, an Tallan ethnicity. An isolated version places him from the island of Puná. Felipillo learned Quechua in Tumbes from natives who spoke it as a second language and he also learned basic Spanish from Pizarro's soldiers. He was later taken back to Panama by Pizarro.

On his return to Peru, Felipillo continued serving as a translator for the Spanish as the conquest of the country carried its course, although historians agree that the interpreting provided by Felipillo was far from faithful or even helpful for the Spanish. After Francisco Pizarro captured the Inca Atahualpa during the Battle of Cajamarca in 1532, Felipillo was the main translator for Pizarro and Atahualpa during their first meeting. Since Felipillo belonged to a rival tribe and was having an affair with one of Atahualpa's concubines, he deliberately translated Pizarro's messages in an inaccurate manner to the Inca king, and spread false rumours.  Felipillo later betrayed Almagro during his expedition to Quito.

In another incident, Felipillo betrayed Almagro during his expedition of Chile by secretly telling the local natives to attack the Spanish since they only wanted their gold and urged them to attack them or run away. Some accounts say that when Almagro found out of Felipillo's betraying motives and his confession about purposely misinterpreting Pizarro's message to Atahualpa, he ordered his soldiers to capture Felipillo and tear his body apart with horses in front of the region's Curaca.

Nowadays, among Peruvians, the word "Felipillo" has taken a meaning similar to "traitor."

See also 
La Malinche

References

External links
 
 Inca Empire
 Spanish conquest of the Inca Empire

Colonial Peru
Peruvian people of indigenous peoples descent
Indigenous people of South America
Peruvian translators
16th-century Peruvian people